In mathematics, Siegel's identity refers to one of two formulae that are used in the resolution of Diophantine equations.

Statement
The first formula is

The second is

Application
The identities are used in translating Diophantine problems connected with integral points on hyperelliptic curves into S-unit equations.

See also
 Siegel formula

References
 
 
 
 
 

Mathematical identities
Diophantine equations